Philippe Jeannol (born 6 August 1958 in Nancy) is a French former professional footballer who played as a defender.

Jeannol was a member of the French squad that won the gold medal at the 1984 Summer Olympics in Los Angeles, California.

External links 
 Philippe Jeannol at fff.fr

1958 births
Living people
Sportspeople from Nancy, France
French footballers
France international footballers
Olympic footballers of France
Olympic gold medalists for France
Footballers at the 1984 Summer Olympics
AS Nancy Lorraine players
Paris Saint-Germain F.C. players
Olympic medalists in football
Ligue 1 players
Medalists at the 1984 Summer Olympics
Association football defenders
Footballers from Grand Est